This is a complete list of hospitals, healthcare centers and clinics in Albania. The country's national emergency line is 112.

Public hospitals

Private hospitals

San Luca Medical Clinic 
| Tiranë 
| 
|-
|}

References

Albania
Hospitals
 
Albania